Imamzadeh Mausoleum is a monument which consists of a mausoleum and mosque, located in the center of Barda. The monument, which was the only 4 minarets built in Azerbaijan in the 14th century, was in the form of a pilgrimage-mausoleum, according to academician Dorn. A mosque was built around it in the 18th century.

Content

Abbasqulu Agha Bakikhanov mentioned in his famous Gulistani-Iram work in 1841: "In many ways, the ruins of the village and the high-ranking three imamzadehs in the cities of Shamakhi, Ganja and Barda, Imamzadeh in the Bulbule village show that this country has always been the homeland of the religious elders"  

According to reports, 5th Imam of Ismaili and Jafari Shiite, Mohammed al-Baqir's granddaughter was buried here. Mohammed al-Baqir's third son, Ibrahim Isa, was buried in Goy Imamzadeh (in 739), 7th km of the city of Ganja. This monument is similar to the monument "Char Minar" in Bukhara. A.A.Bakikhanov also noted in his Gulistani-Iram work that this was a sacred place of pilgrimage in Barda. The fact that this place is a sanctuary also confirms that there is no mosque in Imamzadeh. Figured layout of the bricks of Imamzadeh mosque, coordination of stone and brick in construction, and the use of tiles appear to be influenced from Barda Mausoleum (built in 1322). The monument was rebuilt in 1868 by the famous architect Karbalayi Safikhan Karabakhi (1788, Ahar – 1910, Shusha). He served in the development of Karabakh architecture. Karbalayi Safikhan Karabakhi linked the architectural elements of the eastern architecture with local traditions, especially in the mosques he built. Restoration of Imamzadeh Mosque in Barda (1868), Aghdam Mosque (1870), Ashagi Mosque in Shusha (1874–75) and Govharaga Mosque Restoration (19th century), as well as the Tatar Mosque in Odessa (1870), Garabaghli Mosque (1880) in Ashgabat Safikhan are among works of Karabakhi. 
Believers died in other places but were buried in a cemetery around the Imamzadeh mosque in Barda, according to their testimony.

There are several historic monuments around the Imamzadeh Mosque. 20 meters to the north of the mosque, Bahman Mirza Qajar Mausoleum and to the east, ruins of Akhsadan Baba Mausoleum, which was built in the 14th century, are located.

See also
Architecture of Azerbaijan

References

Buildings and structures in Azerbaijan
Tourist attractions in Azerbaijan
Karbalayi Safikhan Karabakhi buildings and structures